Euthemis is a genus of plant in the family Ochnaceae. The generic name is from the Greek meaning "good law", referring to the even thickness and symmetry of the leaves.

Description
Euthemis species grow as shrubs. The flowers are white or pink. The fruits form as berries.

Distribution and habitat
Euthemis species grow naturally in Cambodia, Sumatra, Peninsular Malaysia and Borneo. Their habitat is kerangas and peat swamp forests from sea-level to  altitude.

Species
 The Plant List recognises 2 accepted species:
 Euthemis leucocarpa 
 Euthemis minor

References

Ochnaceae
Malpighiales genera
Taxonomy articles created by Polbot